Fifteen ships of the French Navy have borne the name Amazone ("Amazon"):

Ships named Amazone 
 , a galley . 
 , a galley. 
 , an Ambitieuse class ordinary galley. 
 , a 38-gun frigate. 
 , a 36-gun frigate. 
 , a galley . 
 , a 32-gun Iphigénie-class frigate . 
 , a tartane. 
 , a 40-gun Junon-class frigate . 
 , a 52-gun frigate . 
 , a frigate captured from Portugal during the Battle of the Tagus. 
 , a steam and sail transport. 
 , an  launched in 1916 and stricken in 1932. 
  a  launched in 1931 and stricken in 1946. 
 , an  launched in 1958 and stricken in 1980.

Ships with similar names 
 , an auxiliary cruiser .

Notes and references
Notes

References

Bibliography
 
 

French Navy ship names